This is a list of international schools in Azerbaijan. The schools must comply with the regulations of the Constitution of Law on Education of Azerbaijan and other relevant legislation. The primary instructional languages at these schools include Azerbaijani language, Russian, English and French.

List of schools 

Evrika Lyceum

References 

 
Education in Azerbaijan
International Baccalaureate schools in Azerbaijan
Azerbaijan